The Live Set is Michael W. Smith's first live album and features selections from two previous albums, The Big Picture and Michael W. Smith Project, and introduces three new songs.

Nothin' But the Blood is a modern re-working of Robert Lowry's classic hymn Nothing But the Blood. I Know was released to radio as a single (the radio edit is only available on The Wonder Years). Emily would later receive a studio release on 1990s Go West Young Man.

The band included Wayne Kirkpatrick, Chris Rodriguez, David Huff, Mark Heimmerman and Chris Harris. A video version of the concert was also available commercially.

Track listing

Chart performance

References

1987 live albums
Michael W. Smith live albums
Reunion Records albums